Arizona School of Dentistry and Oral Health (ASDOH) is a graduate school of dentistry located in the city of Mesa, Arizona, United States, and is affiliated with A.T. Still University.

It was the first dental school in Arizona, having opened its doors in 2003 and graduated its first class in 2007. The curriculum places a large focus on public health. The school is accredited by the American Dental Association.

In 2005, the school received a $268,000 Piper Trust Award to purchase equipment, including a CT scan machine, for treating special needs children in the community.

See also
 American Student Dental Association
 A.T. Still University School of Osteopathic Medicine in Arizona
 List of dental schools in the United States

References

Dental schools in Arizona
Private universities and colleges in Arizona
Educational institutions established in 2003
Buildings and structures in Mesa, Arizona
Education in Mesa, Arizona
Universities and colleges in Maricopa County, Arizona
2003 establishments in Arizona